Pajama Sam 3: You Are What You Eat from Your Head to Your Feet is an adventure game developed and published by Humongous Entertainment for Microsoft Windows, Macintosh, PlayStation, and Steam operating systems. This was the last adventure game to feature Pamela Segall Adlon as the voice of Sam. In the final game of the series, Adlon is replaced by Elisha Ferguson.

Plot
The game starts with Sam having eaten nineteen boxes of cookies. He is about to start on a twentieth one to get enough boxtops to get a new Pajama Man action figure when his mother tells him that it's almost dinnertime. Sam, feeling nauseous from eating so many cookies, feels a rumble coming from the cookie box. As he peeks in, the cookies bust out of the box and escape to the pantry. After finding and putting on his cape, Sam follows the cookies to the pantry where they carry him to a hole and he falls into a cake at the S.S.A.M. (Snacks and Sweets Aggressive Majority) party, a group of fats and sweets working together to take over the Island of MopTop (which is Sam's body). Sam tries to leave the party, refusing to spoil his dinner, which offends the sweets group, and he ends up locked in a prison cell along with Florette, a piece of broccoli, who is a delegate in a Peace Conference at the Food Pyramid. After sneaking the key to the cell, Sam and Florette escape and head over to the Food Pyramid.

Soon, a carrot (that Sam met in the first game), reveals to Sam that the S.S.A.M. is causing mayhem all over the island and that he is organizing the Peace Conference that Florette mentioned to prevent a General officer named Beetfoot from declaring war. However, four out of six delegates are missing: Chuck Cheddar (of the Dairy group), Bean 47 (of the Protein group), Granny Smythe (of the Fruits group) and Pierre Le Pain (of the Breads and Grains group); other than Florette, the only delegate to make it was Luke Wigglebig, a lollipop, who is not part of the Sweet Troops and has "remarkably good taste". Sam agrees to find the four missing delegates and send them right to the Conference.

Sam rescues Chuck from the Headlands (Sam's teeth), Pierre Le Pain from Muscle Beach (Sam's muscles), Bean 47 from the Foothills (Sam's feet) and Granny Smythe from the Bluburbs (Sam's lungs). After rescuing all four delegates, Sam checks up on them at the meeting. At the conference, Chuck and Pierre argue over whether cheese or bread is better, with Bean 47 and Granny Smythe joining in (saying that beans and fruits are better, respectively). Soon, everyone starts calling each other nasty names until Sam intervenes and gives a speech on how "No food is an island" and that they can work together to create new and better foods. The delegates agree and General Beetfoot declares irrevocable peace. Carrot thanks Sam for saving the day and Florette asks Sam if he has to get home for dinner, making Sam realize that he's missed it.

Gameplay
Originally released as a Junior Adventure for children ages 3–8, the aim of this game is to get the 4 missing delegates for the meeting to declare happiness between the 6 food groups, with the intent of teaching children about healthy eating. Each of the four missing delegates can be in either of two unique predicaments, which are randomly chosen on a new playthrough, and as in the second title of the series, players can also choose which scenarios to play with at the options screen.

Reception

Pajama Sam 3 received positive reviews from critics. Bonnie Huie of Macworld praised the game's dialogue and animation work, and noted that the game is more entertaining than it is educational. Charles Herold of The New York Times praised Sam's optimistic outlook, the humor, and the replayability, and declared that the game was enjoyable by both children and adults.

References

External links
 
 Humongous Entertainment official website

2000 video games
Adventure games
Humongous Entertainment games
Infogrames games
ScummVM-supported games
Windows games
Classic Mac OS games
PlayStation (console) games
Point-and-click adventure games
Video games scored by George Sanger
Video games about food and drink
Video games developed in the United States
Android (operating system) games
IOS games
Linux games
MacOS games
Single-player video games
Children's educational video games
Tommo games